James-Little Ecological Reserve is an ecological reserve in Quebec, Canada. It was established on May 8, 1991.

References

External links
 Official website from Government of Québec

Nature reserves in Outaouais
Protected areas established in 1991
1991 establishments in Quebec